Odilon Duarte Braga (3 August 1894, in Guarani, Minas Gerais – 11 July 1958, in Rio de Janeiro) was a Brazilian lawyer and politician.

Braga served as Minister of Agriculture under Getúlio Vargas between July 24, 1935, and November 10, 1937.

20th-century Brazilian lawyers
People from Minas Gerais
1958 deaths
1894 births
Candidates for Vice President of Brazil
Agriculture ministers of Brazil